After the absolute victory of the Socialists in the Parliamentary Election, Dragutin Zelenović of the Socialist Party of Serbia was elected Prime Minister of Serbia by the Parliament on 15 January 1991. On 11 February, his cabinet was formed and elected by the Serbian National Assembly. Zelenović eventually lost support from the party leadership and resigned, causing the new Government to be formed on 23 December 1991.

Cabinet members

See also
Socialist Party of Serbia
Dragutin Zelenović
Cabinet of Serbia

References

Cabinets of Serbia
Cabinets established in 1991
Cabinets disestablished in 1991
1991 establishments in Yugoslavia